The Centralia Sterlings were a Mississippi–Ohio Valley League baseball team based in Centralia, Illinois, USA that played in 1950. They played their home games at Fan's Field. They finished first in the league in their only year of existence, however the finals for the league playoffs against the Paducah Chiefs were canceled.

References

Baseball teams established in 1950
Defunct minor league baseball teams
Professional baseball teams in Illinois
Defunct baseball teams in Illinois
Centralia, Illinois
Baseball teams disestablished in 1950
1950 establishments in Illinois
1950 disestablishments in Illinois
Mississippi-Ohio Valley League